Upsher-Smith Laboratories, LLC is a century-old American pharmaceutical company based in Maple Grove, Minnesota that brings brands and generics to a wide array of customers. Upsher-Smith is a part of Japan-based Sawai Group Holdings Co., Ltd.

Locations 
 Maple Grove, Minnesota: Corporate Headquarters
 Morristown, New Jersey: Corporate Office
 Plymouth, Minnesota: Manufacturing
 Denver, Colorado: Manufacturing

History 
Founded in 1919 as a maker of digitalis drugs, Upsher-Smith has traditionally focused on the manufacture of generic medications. 
In 2017, after owning and operating Upsher-Smith for 47 years, the Evenstad family made the decision to sell the largest part of their company, the generics business, to Sawai Pharmaceutical Co., Ltd., a large publicly traded generics company in Japan that had been seeking entry into the U.S. market.

Upsher-Smith’s non-generic pharmaceuticals businesses Proximagen, Pairnomix and MOBĒ remained with ACOVA, a holding company owned by the Evenstads.

Products 
Upsher-Smith offers brand and generic pharmaceuticals to treat the following disease states:
 Hypertension
 High Cholesterol
 Influenza
 Epilepsy
 Congestive Heart Failure
 Blood Clots
 Alzheimer's Disease
 Depression
 Overactive Bladder
 Heart Arrhythmia
 Schizophrenia
 Multiple Sclerosis
 Low Testosterone
 Migraine

References

Pharmaceutical companies of the United States
Health care companies based in Minnesota
Pharmaceutical companies established in 1919
Maple Grove, Minnesota
2017 mergers and acquisitions
American subsidiaries of foreign companies